John H. Mathis & Company was a shipbuilding company founded around 1900, based at Cooper Point in Camden, New Jersey, U.S, on the Delaware River. At their shipyard at Point and Erie Streets, the company built luxury yachts and also commercial ships. During World War II a variety of Naval vessels were built. The Mathis shipyard closed in 1961.

John H. Mathis & Company
The John H. Mathis Company built a variety of commercial and naval vessels, including freighters, ferries and fishing boats, FS ("Freight and Supply") ships for the Army, minesweepers, net tenders, patrol boats, lighthouse tenders, tugs and barges.

 4 of 32 s
  ... 
 3 of 95 s
  ... 
 5 gasoline barges, 2 water barges

Mathis Yacht Building Company
In 1910, Norwegian-born naval architect John Trumpy joined the company in partnership with John H. Mathis to design and build private yachts. The two companies, the John H. Mathis Company and the Mathis Yacht Building Company, operated side by side at the Camden yard.

The Mathis Yacht Building Company built houseboats, tenders, and yachts for some of the wealthiest American families, including the Sequoia in 1925, which would later serve as the Presidential yacht between 1933 and 1977. After the death of John H. Mathis in 1939, John Trumpy became the sole owner of the Mathis Yacht Building Company. In 1924/1925, Mathis built 30 75-foot patrol boats (known as Six-Bitters) ordered by United States Coast Guard at its Camden shipyard (CG-100 through CG-114 and CG-278 through CG-292).

John Trumpy & Sons
By mid-1942 increased demand meant that the Camden yard capacity was needed for government contracts, so the Mathis Yacht Building Co. relocated to Gloucester City, New Jersey, just downriver of Camden, and was renamed John Trumpy & Sons in 1943. The USS Maquinna (YTB-225) was built there in 1944. In 1947, the Trumpy company relocated again to Annapolis, Maryland.

In 1962, the Annapolis yard was destroyed in a fire and a year later, at the age of 84, John Trumpy died. The company continued under the control of his son John Trumpy Jr., but rising costs, a labor strike, and the advent of cheaper fiberglass hulls meant that in 1974 the company was wound up.

References

External links
 John H. Mathis & Co. Shipbuilders
 John H. Mathis & Company Ship Yard
 John Trumpy & Sons
 Trumpy Yachts

American boat builders
Defunct shipbuilding companies of the United States
Defunct companies based in New Jersey

Companies based in Camden, New Jersey
Shipyards of New Jersey